Tirupati–Vasco da Gama Express is an Express train service connecting Tirupati in Andhra Pradesh, India with Vasco da Gama, Goa, India.

Overview 
This train had its inaugural run on 29 December 2016 and regular run commenced from 5 January 2017.

Rakes 

The train has 10 coaches comprising one AC 2-Tier (A1), one AC 3-Tier (B1), three Second Class Sleepers (SL), three General compartments (unreserved) and two Luggage rakes.

Routeing
The 17419 / 20 Tirupati–Vasco da Gama Express runs from  via , Gooty, Hospet Junction, Gadag Junction railway station, Londa Junction, Castle Rock, Sanverdam, Madgoan.

See also
 Hyderabad–Vasco da Gama Express
 Vasco da Gama–Velankanni Weekly Express

Notes

References

External links 
 Southern Central Railway - Official Website

Transport in Tirupati
Transport in Vasco da Gama, Goa
Railway services introduced in 2016
Express trains in India
Rail transport in Andhra Pradesh
Rail transport in Karnataka
Rail transport in Goa